K25 or K-25 may refer to:
 K-25, a Manhattan Project uranium enrichment facility in Oak Ridge, Tennessee
 K-25 (Kansas highway)
 .k25, a raw image file format
 HMS Azalea (K25), a British Royal Navy ship
 K25, a grant awarded by the National Institutes of Health
 K-25, a Soviet copy of the AIM-7 Sparrow air-to-air missile